The Women's 200 metre freestyle competition of the 2018 African Swimming Championships was held on 11 September 2018.

Records
Prior to the competition, the existing world and championship records were as follows.

Results

Heats
The heats were started on 11 September at 11:30.

Final
The final was started on 11 September.

References

Women's 200 metre freestyle